Calvert College was a college in New Windsor, Maryland that existed from 1852 until 1873.  It was formed on the former site of New Windsor College.  It was operated by Catholics.  In 1873 it closed down and its buildings were sold off and used to form another college, also known as New Windsor College as was its predecessor. More recently the college has been turned into private school called Springdale Preparatory.

Footnotes 

Educational institutions established in 1852
Defunct private universities and colleges in Maryland
New Windsor, Maryland
1852 establishments in Maryland
1873 disestablishments in Maryland
Educational institutions disestablished in 1873